The Frome Cobble Wobble, established in 2009, is an individually timed bicycle hill climb sprint in Frome, Somerset, England. It was first organised by Andrew Denham involving the local community, with support from Councillor Alvin Horsfall to celebrate the stage 5 of the 2009 Tour of Britain, which started in Frome. It is set to become an annual event for the town.

The course begins at the bottom of Stony Street, takes a sharp turn as it joins Catherine Hill, and finishes at the end of the cobbles the top of the hill. The total length of the course is 179 yards, and the average gradient is 1:7.

Previous Winners

References

External links 
[www.thecobblewobble.co.uk/ Official Website]

Cycling competitions in the United Kingdom
Frome
Sports venues in Somerset